The Challenger Eckental is a tennis tournament held in Eckental, Germany since 1997. The event is part of the ATP Challenger Tour and is played on indoor carpet courts

Past finals

Singles

Doubles

References

External links 
 

 
Tennis tournaments in Germany
Carpet court tennis tournaments
ATP Challenger Tour
Sports competitions in Bavaria
Recurring sporting events established in 1997
1997 establishments in Germany